P. Mettupalayam is a panchayat town in Bhavani taluk of Erode district in the Indian state of Tamil Nadu.

Demographics
 India census, P. Mettupalayam had a population of 9139. Males constitute 50% of the population and females 50%. P. Mettupalayam has an average literacy rate of 58%, lower than the national average of 59.5%: male literacy is 69%, and female literacy is 47%. In P. Mettupalayam, 9% of the population is under 6 years of age.

References

Cities and towns in Erode district